Joseph Troy was the bassist and backing vocalist for the band Rx Bandits and sings and plays bass in the garage-punk duo Coke vs. Bills along with childhood friend Matthew Embree, the lead singer and guitarist of Rx Bandits.  He also plays bass in Chiodos (most notably during their 2014 "Parks and Devastation" tour) and for The Sound of Animals Fighting during their live shows.

Sources 
 Spin.com: RX Bandits

External links 
 Rx Bandits.com – Official Website
 MySpace Profile

Year of birth missing (living people)
Living people
American rock bass guitarists
Rx Bandits members